Jiejue (解决 Solution), also featuring the English name Solution on the album cover, is a 1991 Mandarin rock album by Cui Jian. It was his second commercially available album after Rock 'N' Roll On The New Long March, and he was able to have it released in China after adapting some of the lyrics.

Track listing
 解决 (Solve)
 这儿的空间 (Space Here)
 一块红布 (A Red Cloth)
 寂寞就像一团烈火 (Loneliness Is Like Fire)
 投机份子 (Speculators)
 快让我在这雪地上撒点儿野 (Let Me Go Wild In The Snow)
 像一把刀子 (Like A Knife)
 南泥湾 (Nanniwan)
 从头再来 (Start Over)
 最后一枪 (Last Shot)

References

1991 albums
Cui Jian albums
Mandarin-language albums